Back to Oblivion is the third and final studio album by American post-hardcore band Finch, released on September 30, 2014. It is the band's first full-length effort since Say Hello to Sunshine in 2005. After breaking up in 2006, reuniting in 2008, and breaking up again in 2010, Finch regrouped in 2012 and signed with Razor & Tie in 2014. 
"Two Guns to the Temple" was the first song released for the album on August 11, 2014. Brian Virtue (Thirty Seconds to Mars, Deftones) was brought in to produce the record. This is their first full-length album to feature bassist Daniel Wonacott, who first joined Finch when they reunited in 2007. Additionally, it is the band's first studio album with original drummer Alex Pappas since their 2002 debut, What It Is to Burn.

Background
After ending its hiatus that lasted from 2006 to 2007, Finch released a self-titled EP in 2008 and announced it would begin work on a full-length follow up to its second studio album, Say Hello to Sunshine, shortly after. However, after two years of infrequent updates, Finch announced in December 2010 that the band had officially broken up and work on its third studio album had dissolved. From its break-up announcement, Finch explained their reasons for ending the band: "Over the past few years we have collectively gone insane trying to achieve the common goal of writing our new record. It's become obvious to all of us that the thing that made Finch such a special band to be in, was also the key ingredient that was tearing us apart. As we get older and broaden our musical pallets [sic], we are all on separate planets drifting further and further out of orbit." The only two songs from these recording sessions that were officially released — "Hail to the Fire" and "World of Violence" — were available on what was then said to be the band's final release, Epilogue in 2010.

In 2012, Finch's former band manager Andy Harris asked the band if they would be interested in reuniting and only doing two shows in celebration of the 10th-anniversary of the band's 2002 debut album, What It Is to Burn. Harris got the idea from his wife, who was the manager for New Found Glory and arranged some 10th-anniversary shows for their 2002 album, Sticks and Stones. The lineup for these shows featured long-time members Nate Barcalow, Randy Strohmeyer and Alex Linares, in addition to founding member Alex Pappas, who left before the recording of Say Hello to Sunshine, and Daniel Wonacott, who participated in Finch's previous reunion and performed on its self-titled EP. Interest in these anniversary shows grew rapidly, and what started out as only two shows evolved into a multi-leg international tour in support of What It Is to Burn throughout 2013. While on the anniversary tour, Finch started to write new songs, though at the time, it wasn't clear if the band would ever release these songs.

Release and promotion
Back to Oblivion was released on September 30, 2014 through Razor & Tie in North America and on September 29 through Spinefarm Records in Europe. The album is Finch's first through these labels. Finch released a teaser video for Back to Oblivion featuring a song clip and visually showed a digitally distorted picture of the album's cover art, a promotional photo of the band and a close-up of a human eye. The first official song released from the album, "Two Guns to the Temple", was made available for online streaming on August 11 and released as a digital single in some markets shortly after. This was followed by the single "Anywhere but Here", which was made available for online streaming on September 1, and vocalist Nate Barcalow described as: "simply a song about escaping in a world that is on the verge of collapse."

On April 7, 2015, Finch released a video for "Play Dead", which was directed by bassist Daniel Wonacott.

Reception

Back to Oblivion peaked at number 103 on the US Billboard 200, number 11 on the US Alternative Albums, number 6 on the US Hard Rock Albums, and number 28 on the US Top Rock Albums charts.

Track listing

Personnel
Band
 Nate Barcalow – vocals
 Randy Strohmeyer – guitar
 Alex Linares – guitar
 Daniel Wonacott – bass guitar
 Alex Pappas – drums, percussion

Production
 Brian Virtue – production

Charts

References

2014 albums
Finch (American band) albums
Razor & Tie albums